TER Picardie was the regional rail network serving the Picardy region of France. On 27 August 2017, it was merged into the new TER Hauts-de-France. It was based at the Amiens station in the town of Amiens.

Network

Rail

Road 

From 1 July 2009

Rolling stock

Multiple units

 SNCF Class Z 26500
 SNCF Class X 4630
 SNCF Class X 72500
 SNCF Class X 73500
 SNCF Class X 76500 Also called XGC X 76500

Locomotives 
 SNCF Class BB 15000R
 SNCF Class BB 16100
 SNCF Class BB 16500
 SNCF Class BB 66400
 SNCF Class BB 67300
 SNCF Class BB 67400
 SNCF Class BB 69400

Cars and trailers travellers 
 Rame réversible régionale
 RIO NPDC
 RIO 80
 Cars VTU
 A10tu VTU 75/80
 B10rtu VTU 75/78
 B10tu VTU 75/78
 B11rtu VTU 75/78
 B11tu VTU 75/78
 Cars VU
 B9u VU75
 B6DUX rév VU 86
 Cars V2N
 Cars VO2N

Pictures TER Picardie

Rames Reversibles Régionale (R.R.R)

See also 
SNCF
Transport express régional
Réseau Ferré de France
List of SNCF stations in Picardy
Picardy

External links 
 Official Site
 French version via Wikipedia France

 
TER